Luigi Mayer (1755–1803) was an Italian-German artist and one of the earliest and most important late 18th-century European painters of the Ottoman Empire.

Life
Mayer was a close friend of Sir Robert Ainslie, 1st Baronet, a British ambassador to Turkey between 1776 and 1792, and the bulk of his paintings and drawings during this period were commissioned by Ainslie. He  travelled extensively through the Ottoman Empire between 1776 and 1794, and became well known for his sketches and paintings of panoramic landscapes of ancient sites from the Balkans to the Greek Islands, Turkey and Egypt, particularly ancient monuments and the Nile.
Many of the works were amassed in Ainslie's collection, which was later presented to the British Museum, providing a valuable insight into the Middle East of that period. His wife, Clara Barthold Mayer, worked as his assistant and produced her own paintings.

Works
Views in Turkey in Europe and Asia (from 1801), by Sir Robert Ainslie, was a multi-volume work based on Mayer's drawings. There were plates engraved by William Watts. Thomas Milton was involved, producing aquatints of Egyptian views.

Gallery

See also

 List of Orientalist artists
 Orientalism

References

British Museum biography

Notes

1755 births
1803 deaths
18th-century German painters
18th-century German male artists
19th-century German painters
19th-century Italian male artists
18th-century Italian painters
19th-century Italian painters
German male painters
German people of Italian descent
German orientalists
Italian landscape painters
Italian male painters
Orientalist painters
Painters of ruins
18th-century Italian male artists
Travelers in Asia Minor